Neil Stacy (born 1941) is a British actor particularly known for his role in the 1980s television series Duty Free.

Selected television filmography
 The Indian Tales of Rudyard Kipling (1964)
 It's Dark Outside (1965)
 Riviera Police (1965)
 Sherlock Holmes (1965)
 The Man in Room 17 (1966)
 Sergeant Cork (1966)
 Colditz Episode - Lord, Didn't it Rain (1972-1974)
 War and Peace (1972-1973)
 Barlow at Large (1973-1975)
 The Pallisers (1974)
 The Standard (1978)
 Return of the Saint (1978)
 Strangers (1979)
 Quatermass (1979)
 Minder (1979)
 To Serve Them All My Days (1980)
 The Fourth Arm (1983)
 Shackleton (1983)
 Strangers and Brothers (1984)
 Cold Warrior (1984)
 Duty Free (1984-1986)
 Shine on Harvey Moon (1985)
 Three Up, Two Down (1986-1987)
 Rumpole of the Bailey (1987)
 Haggard (1990)
 Lovejoy (1992)
 The Upper Hand (1993)
 The House of Windsor (1994)
 Get Well Soon (1997)
 The Lost Prince (2003)
 Heartbeat (2003)

References

Bibliography 
 Tise Vahimagi. British Television: An Illustrated Guide. Oxford University Press, 1996.

External links 
 

1941 births
Living people
British male television actors
British male film actors
Male actors from Suffolk
People from Mid Suffolk District